Muzaffarabad railway station (Urdu and ) is located in Muzaffarabad, Punjab, Pakistan.

See also
 List of railway stations in Pakistan
 Pakistan Railways

References

External links

Railway stations in Multan District